is a Japanese football player.

Club statistics
Updated to 1 January 2020.

References

External links

Profile at Mito HollyHock

1986 births
Living people
Association football people from Miyagi Prefecture
Japanese footballers
J1 League players
J2 League players
J3 League players
Japan Football League players
Vegalta Sendai players
Júbilo Iwata players
Sagan Tosu players
Thespakusatsu Gunma players
Montedio Yamagata players
Mito HollyHock players
AC Nagano Parceiro players
ReinMeer Aomori players
Footballers at the 2006 Asian Games
Asian Games competitors for Japan
Association football forwards